Anthony Hobson (born 25 January 1963) is a South African cricketer. He played in 61 first-class matches between 1982/83 and 1997/98.

See also
 List of Eastern Province representative cricketers

References

External links
 

1963 births
Living people
South African cricketers
Eastern Province cricketers
Griqualand West cricketers
Western Province cricketers